William Lear "Beverly" Bayne (April 18, 1899 – May 22, 1981) was an American Major League Baseball pitcher with the St. Louis Browns, Cleveland Indians and the Boston Red Sox between 1919 and 1930. Bayne batted and threw left-handed. He was born in Pittsburgh, Pennsylvania.

In a nine-season career, Bayne posted a 31–32 record with 259 strikeouts and a 4.84 earned run average in 662.0 innings pitched.

As a hitter, Bayne was better than average, posting a .290 batting average (62-for-214) with 24 runs, 1 home run and 13 RBI in 199 games pitched.

Bayne died in St. Louis, Missouri, at the age of 82.

External links

Baseball Library

Retrosheet

Boston Red Sox players
Cleveland Indians players
St. Louis Browns players
Major League Baseball pitchers
Baseball players from Pittsburgh
1899 births
1981 deaths